Alberto Barsotti (born 29 February 1964) is a former Italian middle-distance runner.

Career
At the end of 2020 outdoor season his personal best 1:46.33 in 800 m, ran in 1990, is still the 10th Italian best performance of all-time.

Achievements

National titles
Barsotti won three national championships at individual senior level.
 Italian Athletics Championships
 800 m: 1985, 1986
 Italian Athletics Indoor Championships
 800 m: 1995

See also
 Italian all-time top lists – 800 metres
 Italian national track relay team
 Italy at the Military World Games

Notes and references

External links

1964 births
Living people
Italian male middle-distance runners
Sportspeople from the Province of Pisa
Athletics competitors of Fiamme Oro